Umer Aalam is a Pakistani television and film actor, model and  writer. 

He started his journey of Theatre in Islamabad in 2012, he has done Theatre till 2017 and his major theatre plays include Siachen” by Anwar Maqsood and Bananistan by kopykat productions. He has also been working for TV since 2018, his projects include Khaas, Pehli Si Muhabbat, Shehnai (TV series), Raqs-e-Bismil, Berukhi, Nehar, Daraar and recently his feature film Carma - The Movie has been released.

In 2022, Aalam participated in ARY Digital's reality show Tamasha Season 1 and emerged as the winner.

Filmography

Television And Films

References

Living people
Year of birth missing (living people)